Lamaing is a town in Mawlamyine District in the Mon State of south-east Myanmar.

Villages
Mawkanin 
DownPyin
KuoungDoung
Kaut Daught

Notes

External links
 "Lamaing Map — Satellite Images of Lamaing" Maplandia World Gazetteer

Populated places in Mon State

Villages in Myanmar